Joseph Antonio Thomas (13 September 1912 – 19 January 1998) was a Liberal party member of the House of Commons of Canada. He was a foreman and superintendent by career.

He was first elected at the Maisonneuve—Rosemont riding in the 1965 general election, then after a 1966 realignment of riding boundaries he was re-elected at the Maisonneuve riding in the 1968 federal election. That riding was given the Maisonneuve—Rosemont name in 1970 where in the 1972 election Thomas was re-elected. After completing his term in the 29th Canadian Parliament, he left federal office and did not campaign in any further federal elections.

References

External links
 

1912 births
1998 deaths
Liberal Party of Canada MPs
Members of the House of Commons of Canada from Quebec
Politicians from Montreal